Shin Takarajima ("New Treasure Island") is a Japanese manga by Sakai Shichima and Osamu Tezuka that was serialized in 1947. It is the first of Tezuka's manga to be published in tankōbon form. The series is based on Robert Louis Stevenson's 1883 novel Treasure Island.

External links 
 Manga at official Tezuka website
 

Osamu Tezuka manga
1947 manga
Pirate comics
Nautical comics
Children's manga
Treasure Island